Werlein is a German language surname and a variant of Werle. Notable people with the name include:
 Betty Werlein Carter (1910–2000), American publisher, editor and writer
 Elizebeth Thomas Werlein (1883–1946), Historical preservationist
 Ewing Werlein Jr. (1936), American judge
 P. P. Werlein (1812–1885), American music publisher, piano dealer, and musical instrument retailer based in New Orleans
 Sarah Günther-Werlein (1983), German former footballer

References 

German-language surnames
Surnames from given names